Steven T. Shippy, better known by his stage name Prozak, is an American independent rapper and film director from Saginaw, Michigan. He's a member of the group Project:Deadman with Mike E. Clark as well as the group Bedlam with Madness and Staplez. He is one of few rappers of  Chaldean Catholic religious background. In 2011, he officially signed with Strange Music, although he had previously released albums with the label.

Discography

Studio albums

EPs

with Madness & Staplez as Bedlam 
 Chemical Imbalancez Volume One (1999)
 Chemical Imbalancez Volume Two (2001)
 Shock Treatment (2002)
 Bedlamitez Rize (2003)
 Chemical Anthology - Re-release of Vol-1 and 2 (2003)
 The Wickedstock Detroit Show (2003)
 Rare and Unheard (2012)

with Mike E. Clark as Project:Deadman
 Self Inflicted (2004)

Collaborations
KGP - Acidikrevelationz (2000) "Stilborn"
KGP - Mentality Family E.P. (2000) "Psycho Sick Insanity, Facez of Evil"
Cap One - Parafanalia (2001) "Wicked 4 Life, Callin' Me"
Twiztid - Fright Fest 05 EP (2005) "When It Gets Dark," "Need Some Help"
Tech N9ne - Everready (The Religion) (2006) "Trapped," "Holy War" (disc 2)
Jamie Madrox - Phatso: Earth 2 (2006) "OMG (Red Thunder Remix)"
 Simken Heights- Eternal Flame (2006) "Burnt Offerings"
 Tech N9ne -  Misery Loves Kompany (2007) "You Don't Want It"
 Krizz Kaliko - Vitiligo (2008) "Peek-A-Boo"
 Twiztid - End of Days EP (2009) "End of Days"
 Tech N9ne - K.O.D. (2009) "Horns"
 ROKGOD - Mortifikation Vol.1 (2010) "WatchThis" 
King Gordy - Xerxes The God-King (2010) "Dear Mother"
 Knothead - K.N.O.T. (The) Radio, Vol. 1 (2010) "As A Human Being"
 FURY - Escaped from the Lab 2 (2011) "Mr. Christan Man" [Credited as part of Bedlam]
 Tragedy 503 - DarkSide of the Womb (2011) "Dark Side of the Womb"
 Twiztid - Cryptic Collection 4 (2011) "Monster Inside"
 Tech N9ne - Welcome to Strangeland (2011) "My Favorite"
 Krizz Kaliko - Kickin' and Screamin' (2012) "Dream of a King"
 Scum - The GoreFather (2012) "Koo Koo"
 Scum - Mr. ZipperFace EP (2012) "Nail in my Coffin"
 Tech N9ne - Strangeulation (2014) "Strangeulation IV"
 Justinsayne N8V - Wagon Burner (2014) "My Life"
 The Freakz R Us - The Murder Show (2014) "You Did This"
 T.H.C. The Head Choppa - T.H.C. The Head Choppa (2015) "Haters Traitors & Enemies"
 Swag Toof - Toofgang & Palz, Vol. 2: Still Palz (2015) "Tonight"
 The R.O.C. - Digital Voodoo (2017) "When They Hear It"

Filmography
Released a VHS with his group Bedlam entitled HellRidez

He has also directed music videos, notably Tech N9ne's Bout ta Bubble, as well as several of his own videos.

Shippy and his paranormal crew filmed a movie called SEEKERS: A Haunting on Hamilton Street, which is based in Saginaw, MI, where Shippy, Brian Harnois, Father Calder, and his crew go into reportedly haunted places and try to find evidence of the paranormal by video and EVP (Electronic Voice Phenomenon). The DVD was released Friday, 29 October 2010.

Vol. 2 - A Haunting on Hamilton Street 2 premiered at the Temple Theater in Saginaw, MI on 28 and 29 October 2011.

Vol. 3 - A Haunting on Potter Street was released in 2012.

Vol. 4 - A Haunting in Saginaw, Michigan was released in 2013

Vol. 5 - A Haunting on Washington Avenue: The Temple Theatre was released in 2014

Vol. 6 - A Haunting at the Hoyt Library was released in 2015

Vol. 7 - A Haunting on Dice Road: The Hell House was released in 2016

Vol. 8 - A Haunting on Dice Road 2: Town of the Dead was released 3 November 2017

Vol. 9 - A Haunting on Finn Road: The Devil's Grove was released on 26 October 2018

Vol. 10 - A Haunting on Brockway Street was released on 15 November 2019

See also
 Strange Music

References

External links
Official Project: Deadman Website

Bedlam @ Killmusick
Project:Deadman on Song Resource

1977 births
American male rappers
American people of Iraqi-Assyrian descent
Hip hop activists
Horrorcore artists
Living people
Musicians from Saginaw, Michigan
Nu metal singers
Rap rock musicians
Rappers from Michigan
21st-century American rappers
21st-century American male musicians